Big Six or Big 6 may refer to:

Art, entertainment, and media
 Big six in the romantic literature of England, authors of romantic literature of England
 "Big Six" (song), by Judge Dread, 1972
 Big Six wheel, a casino game
 The Big Six, a children's novel by Arthur Ransome
 The Big Six, former name for major film studios until  Disney acquisition of Fox
 The Big 6, a compilation of video games from the Dizzy series for the Amiga CD32
 Big 6 (album), an album by Blue Mitchell

Business and industry
 Big Six auditors, a group of accounting firms, so called from 1989 to 1998, that has since been reduced to the Big Four
 Big Six energy suppliers, the six largest electricity and gas suppliers in the United Kingdom
 Big Six (law firms), in Australia prior to 2012
 Big Six, supermajor, or Big Oil, the six largest publicly owned oil and gas companies
 Big 6, New York Local #6 of the International Typographical Union

Organizations and movements
 Big Six (activists), leaders of major organizations in the civil rights movement within the United States in the 1960s
 The Big Six (Ghana), six Ghanaian nationalists jailed by the British colonial government in 1948

Science and technology 

 Big Six national space agencies: NASA, Roscosmos, ESA, CNSA, ISRO and JAXA

Sports
 BIG6 European Football League, an American football cup competition for club teams
 Big Six (ice hockey), the nickname for the six top-ranked men's ice hockey national teams 
 Big 6 Hockey League, in Saskatchewan, Canada
 Big Six cricket dispute of 1912, involving the "Big Six" Australian cricketers 
 Big Six Conference, later the Big Eight Conference, an unofficial name for the Missouri Valley Intercollegiate Athletic Association from 1929 to 1946
 Big Six Conference, now known as the Pac-12 Conference, an unofficial name for the Athletic Association of Western Universities from 1962 to 1964
 In association football, the six highest performing teams through the 2010s in England's Premier League, see: Emergence of the "Big Six"

Athletes
 Big Six, the nickname for Jason Estrada,  professional boxer born 1980
 Big Six, the nickname for Christy Mathewson, a baseball pitcher from 1900 to 1916

Transportation
 Big Six, nickname for the Mercedes-Benz M186 engine
 Big Six, 2-10-2 type locomotives purchased by B&O Railroad
 Big Six, Baltimore and Ohio class S locomotive
 Big Six, Western Maryland Railway's Shay locomotive #6, the last and second largest Shay produced
 Morris Big Six, a family of motor cars

See also 
 Big One (disambiguation)
 Big Two (disambiguation)
 Big Three (disambiguation)
 Big Four (disambiguation)
 Big Five (disambiguation)
 Big Seven (disambiguation)
 Big Eight (disambiguation)
 Big Ten (disambiguation)
 Big 12
 Big Hero 6 (film), a 3D computer-animated superhero fantasy-comedy film

es:Big Six
it:Big Six